Alessandro Maganza (1556–1630) was an Italian painter of the Mannerist style, born and active in Vicenza, as well as in Venice.

He likely trained with his father, Giovanni Battista Maganza, also a painter;  as well as by Giovanni Antonio Fasolo. He is said to have spent the years 1572–76 in Venice. His first documented work, Virgin and Child with Four Evangelists (1580) was painted for the monastery built around the basilica and sanctuary of Monte Berico in Vicenza. Maganza also frescoed the inner cupola of Palladio's famous Villa Rotonda located near Vicenza, with allegorical figures in colour, again recalling the Paolo Veronese; he also executed large ceiling canvases in tempera for the South and West rooms. His style is described as derivative of Palma il Giovane. He had three sons who became painters: Giovanni Battista the younger, Marcantonio, and Girolamo.

Works

Vicenza

 Madonna and Child with four Evangelists, 1580, Santuario della Madonna di Monte Berico
 Santi Vincenzo e Marco che presentano la città di Vicenza alla Vergine, 1581, Vicenza Cathedral
 Adorazione della Vergine con gli Angeli , 1581 Vicenza Cathedral
 Adoration of the Magi, 1582, Thiene, private collection of Porto Colleoni
 St Valentine heals the sick 1584-1585, Basilica dei Santi Felice e Fortunato
 Pietà e santi, 1585, Vicenza, Santa Croce church
 Sei tele per la cappella del Santissimo Sacramento, 1587-1589, Vicenza Cathedral:
 Ultima Cena
 Orazione nell'orto
 Flagellazione 
 L'imperatore concede i privilegi ai notai,  Pinacoteca di Brera, Milan
 Il doge conferma i privilegi ai notai, Milano, Pinacoteca di Brera
 Prayer in the Garden and Flagellation, late 1500s, Palazzo Chiericati
 Battesimo di Cristo, 1591, Vicenza, Santuario della Madonna di Monte Berico
 San Gerolamo Emiliani con alcuni bimbi di fronte a Cristo e alla Madonna, 1592, Vicenza, Chiesa della Misericordia
 Cristo dona le corone ai santi Pietro e Paolo, 1596, San Pietro
 Martyrdom of Saint Justine, 1596, San Pietro
 San Benedetto accoglie san Mauro, 1596, Vicenza, San Pietro  church
 St Bonaventure receives eucharist from an Angel, 1598, Palazzo Chiericati, Vicenza
 Pietà, 1600, San Pietro
 Cristo morto e donatori, 1600, Schio, Chiesa di San Francesco
 Trinità adorata dai santi Alessandro e Gennaro vescovo, 1600 circa, San Vito di Leguzzano, parish church
 Tredici teleri per il soffitto della Chiesa di San Domenico, 1603-1604, Vicenza, San Domenico church
 Madonna of the Rosary), (1604 - 1608), Barbarano Vicentino, parish church
 Nativity, 1605, Filippini
 Sei piccoli riquadri per l'antico tabernacolo della cappella del Sacramento della Cattedrale, 1606, Vicenza, Curia vescovile:
 Risen Christ
 Faith, Hope, Temperance, and Charity)
 Padre Eterno
 Allegory of Religion and the Virtue, date uncertain, Villa Almerico Capra
 San Vincenzo (Saint Vincent), 1613, Thiene, San Vincenzo church
 Triumph of Sebastian Venier's, Victorious Over the Turks), 1619, Santa Corona
 Martyrdom of Saint Andrew), San Pietro
 Martirio dei santi Leonzio e Carpoforo (Martyr of Saints Leontius and Carpophore), Vicenza Cathedral

Padua
Trasfigurazione, Padova, San Benedetto Vecchio
Adorazione dei Magi (Adoration of the Magi), Padova, San Gaetano Church
Disputa tra i dottori, Padova, San Gaetano church
Pietà, Padova, San Gaetano church
Santa Caterina (Saint Catherine), Padova, San Gaetano church
Gesù salva Pietro e gli Apostoli, attribuita, Padova, San Gaetano church

Other

Portrait of Maddalena Campiglia, Musei civici di Vicenza

See also
Mannerism

References

Grove Dictionary of Art

External links

1556 births
1630 deaths
People from Vicenza
16th-century Italian painters
Italian male painters
17th-century Italian painters
Painters from Vicenza
Painters from Venice
Mannerist painters